Cover Your Heart is a compilation album by American rock band Black Light Burns. 
It consists of a CD (Cover Your Heart) and a DVD (The Anvil Pants Odyssey), which was a professionally shot documentary of when Black Light Burns was touring for roughly a year and a half on their debut album Cruel Melody, which preceded this release.

Track listing

Personnel
Wes Borland – vocals, guitars, bass, keyboards, synthesizers, programming, producer, mixing
Marshall Kilpatric – drums, percussion (on 1-10 and 14)
Nick Annis – guitar on (1, 2 and 5)
Sean Fetterman – bass on (2 and 5)
Greg Isabelle – drums (on 12)
Jeff Hannan – engineering, Mixing
Austin Satterfield – engineering assistant
Dave Collins – mastering

DVD
The DVD "Anvil Pants Odyssey" consists of a nearly two-hour-long documentary with the band, the music videos for "Mesopotamia," "4 Walls," and "Lie," and also features a behind the scenes look at the making of the "Lie" video. The DVD's content was primarily filmed during the summer and fall of 2007 and was filmed and edited by Satchel Underwood, including the video for "Mesopotamia" and the making of "Lie" segment. The video for "Lie" was directed by Josh Evans, while the video for "4 Walls" was directed by Wes Borland.

References

External links
Website
Release Info
Release Date

2008 albums
Black Light Burns albums
Covers albums
2008 video albums
Rockumentaries